Neabsco may refer to:

 Neabsco Creek, a tributary of the Potomac River in Prince William County, Virginia, United States
 Neabsco Iron Works, a former iron foundry in Woodbridge, Virginia, United States
 Neabsco Road (SR 610), a road in Prince William County, Virginia, United States
 Leesylvania, Virginia, United States, a census-designated place formerly known as Neabsco